Minsk Automobile Plant (MAZ) (Open JSC Minski Autamabilny Zavod,  Minskyi Avtomobilnyi Zavod) is a state-run automotive manufacturer association in Belarus, one of the largest in Eastern Europe.

History 

After a decision by the Soviet Industrial command in August 1944, the plant was begun as the Second World War ended. The first MAZ model, the MAZ-200, entered production in 1949. This truck used General Motors-designed two-stroke engines and was a continuation of a truck developed by the Yaroslavl Motor Plant (YaMZ), who also built the engines. Later on, YaMZ's own original engines were developed and implemented in the MAZ-500 series which was first shown in 1955, but only reaching full series production in 1965.

Apartment buildings, shops, medical clinics, cinemas etc. were built in close proximity to the MAZ plant, providing plant workers with local (though limited) necessities. On many of the construction sites, German prisoners of war were working together with Belarusian construction workers. 

It manufactures heavy-duty trucks, buses, trolleybuses, road tractors and semi-trailers for semi-trailer trucks, and cranes. MAZ was, and possibly is, the world's largest manufacturer of TELs (Transporter-Erector-Launchers) for many of the world's mobile ballistic missiles, from the MAZ-543 used to carry and launch the Scud B through to the Topol M's 8-axle TEL.

In 2020, it was said that the MAZ was the primary supplier for the chassis of such Russian army vehicles as the launchers for the Iskander-M and the S-400 because the domestic Russian products are of comparatively low quality.

Political repressions, sanctions
On 21 June 2021, MAZ (as well as its general manager Ivankovich) was added to the sanctions list of the European Union for repressions against workers who participated in mass protests against the authoritarian regime of Alexander Lukashenko following the controversial presidential election of 2020. According to the political decision of the EU,

"[MAZ] is a source of revenue for the Lukashenka regime. OJSC MAZ has offered its premises and equipment to stage a political rally in support of the regime. Therefore, OJSC “MAZ” benefits from and supports the Lukashenka regime."

Moreover,
Employees of OJSC “MAZ” who took part in strikes and violent protests in the aftermath of fraudulent August 2020 elections in Belarus, were intimidated and later laid off by the company’s managements. A group of employees was locked indoors by OJSC MAZ to prevent them from joining the other protesters. Therefore, MAZ is responsible for the repression of civil society and supports the Lukashenka regime.

On the same day, MAZ and Ivankovich were also sanctioned by Canada. Later, Switzerland also sanctioned the company and its general manager.

Organization 
The association consists of the MAZ plant proper, located in Minsk, which is the main enterprise of the association, as well as several secondary enterprises:
 РУП «БААЗ» (in Baranavichy)
 РУП «ОЗАА» (in Asipovichy)
 РУА «КЗТШ» (in Zhodino)
 РУП «Літмаш» (in Minsk),
 ПРУП «ДЭМЗ» (in Dzyarzhynsk)
 РУП «СтройМАЗтрест» (in Minsk)
At some points of its history, MAZ was "united" with another heavy automobile company  - BELAZ also located in Minsk area.

In 1991, a division specialising in heavy wheeled military vehicles was spun off into a separate business, MZKT.

MAZ is 100% state-owned company.

Products 
Among other products, MAZ city buses (see pictures below) are operating throughout Belarus, as well as in Russia, Ukraine, Poland, Romania, Serbia, Latvia and Estonia.

In Serbia, working in cooperation with a local-based company BIK (Bus industries Kragujevac), a production of gas-powered buses named BIK-203 has been agreed, which are based on the platform of MAZ-203 model.

MAZ-MAN 
In 1997, together with MAN, a joint Belarusian-German company JSC MAZ-MAN,  was set up, which by 1998 had established full-scale production of heavy vehicles, using the F90 MAN cabs introduced 1986 and replaced in 1994. While production of tractors for international trade with 4x2 and 6x4 chassis layouts was a stated goal, development of exhaust gas regulations within the EU turned this into illusion.

Models

Cars
 MAZ-1500 (1959, MAZ's only car)

Trucks

 MAZ-200 (1950, formerly built by YaAZ from 1947 to 1950)
 МАZ-200V (1952, tractor-trailer version of MAZ-200)
 МАZ-205 (1950, dump truck version of MAZ-200)
 МАZ-500/MAZ-500A (1965)
 MAZ-501 (1955, logging truck version of MAZ-200)
 МАZ-501V (tractor-trailer version of MAZ-501)
 МАZ-502 (1957, 4x4 version of MAZ-200)
 МАZ-502V (tractor-trailer version of MAZ-502)
 МАZ-503/MAZ-503A (1958, dump truck version of MAZ-500)
 MAZ-504/MAZ-504A (1965, tractor-trailer version of MAZ-500)
 МАZ-505 (1962, prototype 4x4 truck based on MAZ-500)
 MAZ-506 (1954, prototype dump truck based on MAZ-205)
 МАZ-509 (1969, logging truck version of MAZ-500)
 MAZ-510 (1965, prototype dump truck based on MAZ-503)
 МАZ-511 (dump truck version of MAZ-500)
 MAZ-512/MAZ-500C (cold weather version of MAZ-500)
 MAZ-513/MAZ-500YU (hot weather version of MAZ-500)
 MAZ-514 (1965, prototype three-axle truck based on MAZ-500)
 МАZ-515 (1965, prototype tractor-trailer version of MAZ-514)
 МАZ-516 (1969)
 MAZ-520 (1972, prototype truck based on MAZ-504)
 MAZ-525 (1951, later built by BelAZ)
 MAZ-528 (1955, prototype wheeled dozer)
 MAZ-529 (1955, production moved to MoAZ in 1958)
 MAZ-530 (1957, later built by BelAZ)
 MAZ-532 (1957, prototype logging truck)
 MAZ-535 (1958; production moved to KZKT in 1961)
 MAZ-537 (1959; production moved to KZKT in 1963)
 MAZ-538 (1964, wheeled dozer)
 MAZ-541 (1956, aircraft tug based on MAZ-525)
 МАZ-543/МАZ-7310 (1962)
 MAZ-547/MAZ-7916 (1972)
 MAZ-2000 (1988, prototype truck)
 MAZ-3650 (2019)
 МАZ-4370 (1999)
 МАZ-4371 (2003)
 МАZ-4380 (2010)
 МАZ-4471 (2006)
 МАZ-4570 (2002)

 МАZ-5309 (2008)
 MAZ-5316 (1999, two-axle version of MAZ-6317)
 MAZ-5334 (1977, cab-chassis version of MAZ-5335)
 MAZ-5335 (1977)
 МАZ-5336 (1978)
 МАZ-5337 (1978)
 МАZ-5340 (2002)
 MAZ-5428 (1977)
 MAZ-5429 (1978)
 MAZ-5430 (1977)
 МАZ-5432 (1981)
 МАZ-5433 (1987)
 МАZ-5434 (1990)
 МАZ-5440 (1997)
 МАZ-5442
 МАZ-5516 (1994?, based on MAZ-6303)
 MAZ-5549 (1978)
 MAZ-5550 (2006)
 МАZ-5551 (1985)
 МАZ-6303 (1990s)
 МАZ-6310 (2007)
 МАZ-6312 (2007)
 МАZ-6317 (1991)
 МАZ-6417
 MAZ-6418
 МАZ-6422 (1978)
 МАZ-6425 (tractor-trailer version of MAZ-6317)
 МАZ-6430 (1997)
 MAZ-6440 (2011, prototype)
 МАZ-6501 (2008)
 MAZ-6502 (2015)
 МАZ-6516
 МАZ-6517 (1994)
 МАZ-7410 (based on MAZ-543)
 МАZ-7906 (1984, prototype)
 MAZ-7907 (1985)
 МАZ-7910 (based on MAZ-543)
 MAZ-7922 (1990, prototype)
 MAZ-79221 (1996, later built by MZKT)

Buses

 MAZ-101 (1993, based on Neoplan N4016)
 MAZ-103 Omnibus (1996, based on MAZ-101)
 MAZ-103T Trolleybus (1999)
 MAZ-104 (1997, based on MAZ-103)
 MAZ-105 articulated (1997, based on MAZ-103)
 MAZ-107 three axle (2001, based on MAZ-103)
 MAZ-152 city bus (1999)
 MAZ-163
 MAZ-171 Airport bus (2005)
 MAZ-203 Omnibus (2006)
 MAZ-203T Trolleybus (2006)
 MAZ-205 (2009)
 MAZ-206 Omnibus (2006)
 MAZ-207
 MAZ-215 (2014)
 MAZ-226 (2007)
 MAZ-231
 MAZ-241
 MAZ-251 Tourist (2006)
 MAZ-256 Omnibus (2006)
 MAZ-257 (2019)
 MAZ-271 (2020)
 MAZ-281 (2019)
 MAZ-303 (2019)

Special models 
  MAZ-535/MAZ-537 - The MAZ-535 and the heavier version MAZ-537 were developed in the early 1960s and built to transport rockets and tanks of various types.
  MAZ-543/MAZ-7310 - The MAZ-543 was also designed for the transport of medium-and long-range missiles and has the same specifications as the MAZ-537. The MAZ-543 is best known as mobile missile launch pad of Scud missiles. In 1976, the MAZ-7310 was released. It is similar to the MAZ-543 but without the special equipment. In addition, there are various modifications of the vehicle, such as the MAZ-547 as a mobile launch pad for SS-20 missiles or the MAZ-7917 as a launch pad of Topol intercontinental missile.
 MAZ-547/MAZ-7916 - The MAZ-547 is a six-axle version of the MAZ-543 and was used for the RSD-10 Pioneer IRBM. The MAZ-7916, an improved version, was released in 1980.
 MAZ-7904 - The MAZ-7904 is the largest wheeled vehicle that was ever designed for military purposes in the USSR. The prototype was designed in 1982 as a support vehicle for intercontinental ballistic missiles, but never went into production. The vehicle was found in 2007 in a hangar at Baikonur, but was scrapped in 2010 due to severe corrosion.
 MAZ-7906/MAZ-7907 - The MAZ-7906 was an eight-axle, 16 wheel Transporter-erector-launcher intended to transport the Tselina-2 missile, a projected road-mobile variant of the RT-23 Molodets. In 1985, the 12-axle MAZ-7907 was developed, also intended for the Tselina-2. Two prototypes were produced, but despite successful factory trials, no production followed. At least one seems to have been used after the collapse of the USSR for transportation of bridge parts and ships. One unit is stored at the Minsk Wheel Tractor plant awaiting restoration.
 МАZ-7912/MAZ-7917 - The MAZ-7912 is a seven-axle, 14 wheel TEL for the Topol missile. In 1984, the MAZ-7917 was released, lengthened  and had crew cabins similar to the MAZ-7916.

Generations

Sponsorship in football 
 1999–2002: Torpedo-MAZ Minsk

Gallery

Buses

Trucks

Notes

References 
 Peter J. Davies: Trucks of the World - The encyclopedia of makes and models from 2002. Motor Book, Stuttgart.  .

External links 

 Official site
 Official Maz-Man website
 MAZ - russian history

 
 
Truck manufacturers of the Soviet Union
Bus manufacturers of Belarus
Trolleybus manufacturers
Truck manufacturers of Belarus
Defence companies of the Soviet Union
Bus manufacturers of the Soviet Union
Vehicle manufacturing companies established in 1944
1944 establishments in Belarus
1944 establishments in the Soviet Union
Economy of Minsk
Companies based in Minsk
Belarusian brands
Soviet brands
Electric vehicle manufacturers of Belarus